WBTC may refer to:- 

 WBTC (AM), a radio station in Uhrichsville, Ohio, United States
 WBTC, "wrapped" Bitcoin in the Ethereum blockchain
 West Bengal Transport Corporation, a state government corporation
 West Bengal Trinamool Congress, a region level political party in India